Finnøy is a former municipality in Rogaland county, Norway. The  island municipality existed from 1838 until its dissolution in 2020 when it was merged into Stavanger Municipality. It was located in the traditional district of Ryfylke. The administrative centre of the municipality was the village of Judaberg.

The Finnøy Tunnel connects the two islands of Finnøy and Talgje to the mainland. The rest of the islands are accessible only by boat.

Finnøy is an agricultural community dominated by dairy, meat, poultry, and fish farming products, with strong horticultural traditions, mainly greenhouse production of tomatoes, as well as some tourism.

Prior to its dissolution in 2020, the  municipality is the 375th largest by area out of the 422 municipalities in Norway. Finnøy was the 256th most populous municipality in Norway with a population of 3,235.

General information

The parish of Finnø was established as a municipality on 1 January 1838 (see formannskapsdistrikt law). It originally encompassed the islands of Finnøy, Talgje, and Fogn as well as the small surrounding islets and the southeasternmost corner of the island of Rennesøy. On 1 January 1918, the part of Finnøy located on the island of Rennesøy (population: 72) was transferred from Finnøy to the neighboring municipality of Rennesøy.

During the 1960s, there were many municipal mergers across Norway due to the work of the Schei Committee. On 1 January 1965, the municipality of Finnøy was enlarged when it was merged with the entire municipality of Sjernarøy (population: 819), the northeastern part of Ombo island (population: 89) from the municipality of Jelsa, and the Fisterøyene islands (population: 246) from the municipality of Fister.

On 1 January 2020, the municipalities of Finnøy, Rennesøy, and Stavanger were merged into one, large municipality called Stavanger.

Name
The municipality is named after the island of Finnøy. The meaning of the first element is unknown and the last element is øy which means "island."  Before 1918, the name was written "Finnø."

Coat of arms
The coat of arms was granted on 23 September 1983. Despite its recent adoption, it has old roots. The arms show a silver or white wing on a blue background. The arms were derived from the arms of the Hestbø family (which included Ogmund Finnsson), one of the mightiest families in the area in the 14th century. They had their stronghold on their Hesby estate on the island of Finnøy in the present municipality.

Churches
The Church of Norway has three parishes within the municipality of Finnøy. It is part of the Tungenes prosti (deanery) in the Diocese of Stavanger.

History

Finnøy was at the top of its power in the middle of the fourteenth century when the King's representative Ogmund Finnsson had his seat at Hesby on the west side of the island of Finnøy. The medieval, stone Hesby Church, dating back to at least the thirteenth century, still stands at Hesby.

It is often claimed that the Norwegian mathematician Niels Henrik Abel (1802–1829) was born on Finnøy, since his father Søren Georg acted as rector there. Recent studies indicates, however, that he was born in Nedstrand, a nearby parish. However, he was raised on Finnøy.

Geography
The island municipality of Finnøy is located on the south side of the Boknafjorden. The main islands of Finnøy include Finnøy, Talgje, Fogn, Halsnøya, Sjernarøyane, and the north and west parts of the island of Ombo. The islands of Talgje and Finnøy are connected to the mainland by the undersea Finnøy Tunnel. The rest of the islands are only accessible by boats.

Government
All municipalities in Norway, including Finnøy, are responsible for primary education (through 10th grade), outpatient health services, senior citizen services, unemployment and other social services, zoning, economic development, and municipal roads. The municipality is governed by a municipal council of elected representatives, which in turn elect a mayor.  The municipality falls under the Ryfylke District Court and the Gulating Court of Appeal.

Municipal council
The municipal council of Finnøy was made up of 21 representatives that were elected to four year terms. The party breakdown for the councils was as follows:

Notable people
Torolf Nordbø

See also
List of former municipalities of Norway

References

External links
 
 
 
Municipal fact sheet from Statistics Norway 

 
Stavanger
Former municipalities of Norway
1838 establishments in Norway
2020 disestablishments in Norway